is a Japanese privately-held publishing company headquartered in Bunkyō, Tokyo. Kodansha produces the manga magazines Nakayoshi, Afternoon, Evening, Weekly Shōnen Magazine and Bessatsu Shōnen Magazine, as well as the more literary magazines Gunzō, Shūkan Gendai, and the Japanese dictionary Nihongo Daijiten. Kodansha was founded by Seiji Noma in 1910, and members of his family continue as its owners either directly or through the Noma Cultural Foundation.

History
Seiji Noma founded Kodansha in 1910 as a spin-off of the Dai-Nippon Yūbenkai ("Greater Japan Oratorical Society") and produced the literary magazine Yūben as its first publication. The name Kodansha (taken from Kōdan Club, a now-defunct magazine published by the company) originated in 1911 when the publisher formally merged with the Dai-Nippon Yūbenkai. The company has used its current legal name since 1958. It uses the motto .

Kodansha Limited owns the Otowa Group, which manages subsidiary companies such as King Records (official name: King Record Co., Ltd.) and Kobunsha, and publishes Nikkan Gendai, a daily tabloid. It also has close ties with Disney, and officially sponsors Tokyo Disneyland.

Kodansha is the largest publisher in Japan. Revenues dropped due to the 2002 recession in Japan and an accompanying downturn in the publishing industry: the company posted a loss in the 2002 financial year for the first time since the end of World War II. (The second-largest publisher, Shogakukan, has done relatively better. In the 2003 financial year, Kodansha had revenues of ¥167 billion compared to ¥150 billion for Shogakukan. Kodansha, at its peak, led Shogakukan by over ¥50 billion in revenue.)

Kodansha sponsors the prestigious Kodansha Manga Award, which has run since 1977 (and since 1960 under other names).

Kodansha's headquarters in Tokyo once housed Noma Dōjō, a kendo practice-hall established by Seiji Noma in 1925. However, the hall was demolished in November 2007 and replaced with a dōjō in a new building nearby.

The company announced that it was closing its English-language publishing house, Kodansha International, at the end of April 2011. Their American publishing house, Kodansha USA, will remain in operation.

Kodansha USA began issuing new publications under the head administrator of the international branch Kentaro Tsugumi, starting in September 2012 with a hardcover release of The Spirit of Aikido. Many of Kodansha USA's older titles have been reprinted. According to Daniel Mani of Kodansha USA, Inc., "Though we did  publishing new books for about a year starting from late 2011, we did continue to sell most of our older title throughout that period (so Kodansha USA never actually closed)."

In October 2016, Kodansha acquired publisher Ichijinsha and turned the company into its wholly-owned subsidiary.

On November 30, 2022, Kodansha announced an extended partnership with Disney to release anime originals based on its manga exclusively on video streaming service Disney+ starting with the second season of Tokyo Revengers.

Relationships with other organizations
The Kodansha company holds ownership in various broadcasting companies in Japan. It also owns shares in Nippon Cultural Broadcasting and Kobunsha. In the 2005 takeover-war for Nippon Broadcasting System between Livedoor and Fuji TV, Kodansha supported Fuji TV by selling its stock to Fuji TV.

NHK
Kodansha has a somewhat complicated relationship with NHK (Nippon Housou Kyoukai), Japan's public broadcaster. Many of the manga and novels published by Kodansha have spawned anime adaptations. Animation such as Cardcaptor Sakura, aired in NHK's Eisei Anime Gekijō time-slot, and Kodansha published a companion magazine to the NHK children's show Okāsan to Issho. The two companies often clash editorially, however. The October 2000 issue of Gendai accused NHK of staging footage used in a news report in 1997 on dynamite fishing in Indonesia. NHK sued Kodansha in the Tokyo District Court, which ordered Kodansha to publish a retraction and pay ¥4 million in damages. Kodansha appealed the decision and reached a settlement whereby it had to issue only a partial retraction and to pay no damages. Gendais sister magazine Shūkan Gendai nonetheless published an article probing further into the staged-footage controversy that has dogged NHK.

Honors
 Japan Foundation: Japan Foundation Special Prize, 1994.

List of magazines

Manga magazines
This is a list of manga magazines published by Kodansha.

Male-oriented manga magazines

Kodomo (children's) manga magazines
Comic BomBom (1981–2007) 

Shōnen manga magazines
Weekly Shōnen Magazine (since 1959)
Monthly Shōnen Magazine (since 1975)
Shōnen Sirius (monthly since 2005)
Bessatsu Shōnen Magazine (monthly since 2009)
Shōnen Magazine Edge (monthly since 2015)
Shōnen Magazine R (monthly since 2015)
Suiyōbi no Sirius (website, since 2013)
Magazine Pocket (app/website, since 2015)

Discontinued
Shōnen Club (monthly, 1914-1962)
Monthly Manga Shōnen (1947–1955)
Magazine Special (monthly, 1983–2017)
Monthly Shōnen Magazine GREAT (1993–2009)
Monthly Shōnen Rival (2008–2014)
Magazine E-no (2009–2011)
Monthly Shonen Magazine+ (2011–2014)

Seinen manga magazines
Weekly Young Magazine (since 1980)
Monthly Young Magazine (since 2009)
Morning (weekly since 1982; originally called Comic Morning)
Afternoon (monthly, since 1986)
Good! Afternoon (monthly since 2012; bi-monthly from 2008 to 2012)
Comic Days (app/website, since 2018)
Yanmaga Web (website, since 2020)
Morning Two Web (website, since 2022)

Discontinued
 (1986–1995)
Mr. Magazine (1991–2000)
Monthly Magazine Z (1999–2009)
Young Magazine Uppers (1998–2004)
Morning Two (2006–2022)
Nemesis (2010–2018)
Young Magazine the 3rd (2014–2021)
Evening (2001-2023)

Female-oriented manga magazines

Shōjo manga magazines
Nakayoshi (monthly since 1954)
Bessatsu Friend (monthly since 1965)
Betsufure (quarterly since ????)
Dessert (monthly since 1996)
Nakayoshi Lovely (5 issues per year, since ????)
The Dessert (monthly, since ????)

Discontinued
Shōjo Club (monthly, 1923–1962)
Shōjo Friend (1962–1996)
Mimi (1975–1996)
Aria (monthly, 2010–2018)

Josei manga magazines
Be Love (monthly 1980-1982, 2018-present, bimonthly 1982-2018; originally called Be in Love)
Kiss (monthly since 1992)
Kiss Plus (bi-monthly, ????-2014; succeeded by Hatsu Kiss)
ITAN (quarterly since 2010)
Hatsu Kiss (bi-monthly 2014-2018, monthly 2018-2021)

Web magazines
Honey Milk (BL magazine)
Ane Friend
comic tint

Literary magazines
 Gunzo, monthly literary magazine
 Mephisto, tri-annual literary magazine focusing on mystery and detective stories
 Faust

Book series

Published by Kodansha Ltd.
 Kodansha Gakujutsu Bunko (講談社学術文庫) (English, "Kodansha Academic Paperback Library")  (1970)

Published by Kodansha International/USA Ltd.
 Japanese for Busy People Series
 Japanese for Young People Series
 Kodansha Bilingual Books
 Kodansha Globe
 This Beautiful World

Miss iD 
Kodansha organizes the Miss iD pageant, which started in 2012. iD stands for "identity", "idol", "I", and "diversity", and it is described as a pageant to discover diverse role models for the "new era" without being bound to conventional beauty and lifestyle standards. Married and transgender women are allowed to participate. The Miss ID title is awarded to more than one person each year, and holders of the title include actress Tina Tamashiro, singer Rie Kaneko, and musician Ena Fujita. Computer-generated character Saya and AI character Rinna were semifinalists in the 2018 pageant.

See also

 Edwin O. Reischauer Memorial House
 Kodansha Noma Memorial Museum
 Noma Prize
 Tuttle Publishing
 Vertical (publisher)

References

External links

 Kodansha Official Japanese website 
 Kodansha Official English Website
 Kodansha USA Official Website (archive)
 Kodansha USA Official Website
 Kodansha Anime News Network

 
Japanese companies established in 1910
Publishing companies established in 1910
Book publishing companies in Tokyo
Comic book publishing companies in Tokyo
Liberal media in Japan
Magazine publishing companies in Tokyo
Mass media companies based in Tokyo
Manga distributors
Publishers of adult comics
Japanese brands
Anime companies
Disney comics publishers